Order of the Leech is the tenth studio album by the British grindcore band Napalm Death, released in 2002 through Spitfire. Although credited in the line-up, Jesse Pintado never performed. The second guitar is actually Mitch Harris overdubbing, hence marking this album's lineup as today's lineup. "The Great Capitulator" is exactly 2:49. At the end of the song, a long silence follows from 2:50 to 9:56. At 9:57 a soundbite comes fading in of a fan speaking of his attitude to metal music, mentioning bands like Krabathor or Immortal. His speech is then translated in Czech. It is the last album in a trilogy to feature these kinds of soundbites, with the others being Leaders Not Followers EP and Enemy of the Music Business.

Track listing

Personnel

Napalm Death
 Mark "Barney" Greenway – lead vocals
 Mitch Harris – guitars, backing vocals
 Shane Embury – bass
 Danny Herrera – drums

Additional Personnel
 Simon Efemey - engineering, mixing & mastering
 Russ Russell - engineering
Will Bartle - engineering [Assisted at Chappel]
Dan "Frank Crackfield" - engineer [Assisted at Parkgate]
Jesse Pintado - music (10 & 11)

Album Design
Mick Kenney - artwork [Image Manipulation], design [Front Cover]
Mid (Rob Middleton) - artwork [Images Supplied]  
reesycle.com (Meurig Rees) - layout

References

Napalm Death albums
2002 albums